The 1961–62 Women's Basketball European Cup was the fourth edition of the competition. Daugava Riga won its third trophy in a row, beating SKA Leningrad in the final. It was the first time the final was played by two teams from the same championship; Daugava and SKA were respectively the champion and runner-up of the 1961 Soviet Championship. This was unparalleled throughout the European Cup era.
 
Austria, Hungary, Israel and Turkey took part in the competition for the first time. In addition Yugoslavia returned after a one-year absence. For the first time two African teams played the competition, as in addition to Morocco's Sportif Casablancais Portugal was represented by Benfica de Lubango from Portuguese Angola. Due to the increase in the number of contestants, the defending champion entered the competition in the quarter-finals instead of the semi-finals.

As the competition reached 16 teams the two qualifying rounds from the previous season were merged into a Round of 16. However, since Daugava Riga received a bye 15 teams were left to play seven ties, so a triangular was arranged between Benfica de Lubango, Medina La Coruña and Sportif Casablancais in La Coruña.

Round of 16

Quarter-finals

Semi-finals

Final

References 

Champions Cup
European
European
EuroLeague Women seasons